Laila's Wisdom is the second studio album by American rapper Rapsody, released on September 22, 2017, by Jamla Records and Roc Nation. It is Rapsody's first album released under her partnership with Roc Nation. The album features collaborations with Kendrick Lamar (with whom Rapsody had previously collaborated on To Pimp a Butterfly), Anderson .Paak, Busta Rhymes, Lance Skiiiwalker, Black Thought, BJ the Chicago Kid, and Musiq Soulchild, among others.

Background
The album is Rapsody's first following her signing with Roc Nation in 2016, and follows her mixtape Crown (2016).

Rapsody has previously collaborated with several of the guests on the record, including Kendrick Lamar, who she collaborated with on the track "Complexion (A Zulu Love)" from Lamar's 2015 album To Pimp a Butterfly, which is credited with gaining Rapsody wider attention than she had had previously. Lamar also rapped on the track "Rock the Bells" from her 2011 mixtape For Everything. Rapsody also appeared on Anderson .Paak's album Malibu, on "Without You". Paak also appeared on Crown.

In early September, Rapsody released "You Should Know" by Busta Rhymes as the first song from the album. In an Instagram post, Rhymes called the album "the best album I've heard not only from a female MC but in Hip hop period as well that I've personally had a chance to hear from top to bottom in its entirety that I've probably in the last 10yrs ".

The guest appearances for the album were revealed in a video featuring Rapsody in a mural surrounded by the guests that appear on the record.

Critical reception

Laila's Wisdom received widespread acclaim from critics. At Metacritic, which assigns a normalized rating out of 100 to reviews from mainstream publications, the album received an average score of 87, based on seven reviews. Michael J. Warren of Exclaim! called it Rapsody's best work, as well as "the best amongst her peers, the sort of album that transcends the lane she was in beforehand, transcends whatever antiquated gender biases may still permeate the genre and puts her in the same category as your favourite rapper (who's now clamouring for a Rapsody feature)." Jesse Fairfax of HipHopDX found that "Rapsody evolves on this latest album—increasingly comfortable revealing a wide range of personal facets while developing into an apt storyteller." Writing for XXL, Peter A. Berry described the album as "a smooth, cohesive and powerfully insightful effort." In his review for AllMusic, writer Andy Kellman praised Rapsody's progression on the album, writing that "'Laila's Wisdom' is Evans' lyrically broadest and musically richest work, yet it doesn't have the sprawling quality of the first album. There's a finer, detail-filled shape to it, from the 'Young, Gifted, and Black' (Aretha)-sampling title track to 'Jesus Coming,' an astonishing finale in which Evans relates the aftermath of a playground tragedy from multiple perspectives."

Accolades
The album received two Grammy Award nominations for Best Rap Album and Best Rap Song.

Track listing
Track listing and credits adapted from Tidal.

Notes
 Amber Navaran, Max Bryk, and Andris Mattison are collectively credited as Moonchild, their band name, for their feature on "Nobody".

Personnel
Credits adapted from Tidal.

 Rapsody – lead vocals , engineering 
 9th Wonder – engineering , recording arranger , additional vocals 
 Anderson .Paak – additional vocals 
 Black Thought – additional vocals 
 Gwen Bunn – vocals, vocal arranger 
 Busta Rhymes – vocals 
 Coup de Grace – guitar, piano, recording arranger 
 Eric G – recording arranger 
 Ka$h Don't Make Beats – engineering 
 Khrysis – engineering 
 Terrace Martin – keyboards , recording arranger , saxophone , synthesizer , vocals 
 Merna – additional vocals 
 Musiq Soulchild – additional vocals 
 Amber Navaran – vocals 
 Max Bryk – keyboards 
 Andris Mattison – keyboards 
 James Poyser – keyboards 
 Taylor Jon Shepard – additional keyboards 
 Heather Victoria – additional vocals 
 Marlon Williams – string arranger , guitar, recording arranger 
 Young Guru – engineering

Charts

References

2017 albums
Albums produced by 9th Wonder
Albums produced by Khrysis
Albums produced by Nottz
Rapsody albums
Roc Nation albums